Michael Robinson McGrady (October 4, 1933 – May 13, 2012) was an American journalist and author. He is perhaps best known for orchestrating the 1969 literary hoax Naked Came the Stranger, a novel he wrote with a group of fellow Newsday journalists as an attempt to parody the bestsellers of the era, with the book becoming a hit in its own right.

Early and personal life
McGrady was born in New York City, and grew up in Lilliwaup, Washington and Port Washington, New York. He graduated from Yale University in 1955, and was a Nieman Fellow at Harvard University in 1968 and 1969.

In around 1959, he married Corinne Young, and they had three children. He had one previous marriage which ended in divorce.

Career
In 1962, McGrady became a columnist for Newsday, a newspaper based on Long Island, where he wrote about the civil rights movement and the Vietnam War. His columns about the war, written from the frontlines in a series called a A Dove in Vietnam, won an award from the Overseas Press Club in 1967 and were later published as a book.

Naked Came the Stranger

In 1966, he assembled a group of two dozen fellow Newsday writers in an attempt to write and publish a novel that would parody the prurient bestsellers of the era, which he found to be badly written, citing Jacqueline Susann's Valley of the Dolls as a particular impetus. He wanted the book to be sexually explicit, but of low literary quality, and tasked each participant to draft one chapter in a deliberately poor style. McGrady told the authors that "true excellence in writing" would be removed, as he wanted to demonstrate that the work's sexual content alone could guarantee its success.

The resulting book, Naked Came the Stranger, follows a housewife who, after learning her husband is having an extramarital affair, decides to have as many affairs of her own as she can. Each chapter describes an encounter with a different man, which include lawyers, businessmen, a member of the mafia, and a rabbi. It was written under the pseudonym "Penelope Ashe", who was represented in photographs and early interviews by Billie Young, McGrady's sister-in-law. It was co-edited with Harvey Aronson, a Newsday editor, and published in 1969 by Lyle Stuart, who often published controversial books. As McGrady had hoped, the novel became a bestseller. The book's true authorship was acknowledged shortly after its release, though this only brought further attention; it sold about 20,000 copies before the hoax was revealed, and sales more than quadrupled afterward. A subsequent paperback run sold over a million copies.

McGrady later said he had been offered $500,000 to write a sequel, but he turned it down. He subsequently wrote an "instructional manual" based on the creation of the book, called Stranger than Naked: Or, How to Write Dirty Books for Fun and Profit (1970).

Later career
McGrady continued with Newsday, though he did take time off to write other books, such as The Kitchen Sink Papers: My Life as a Househusband (1975), in which he spent a year as a homemaker while his wife was the family's sole breadwinner. He said the experience made his marriage stronger, and led to him and his wife establishing equity in sharing home and professional duties. He also co-wrote two of Linda Lovelace's memoirs, Ordeal (1980) and Out of Bondage (1986).

In 1982, McGrady became Newsdays film critic, a position he held until he retired in 1990.

Later life and death
After retirement, McGrady moved from Northport, New York back to Lilliwaup with his wife. He died from pneumonia at a hospital in Shelton, Washington on May 13, 2012, at the age of 78.

Books by Mike McGrady 

 Ordeal with Linda Lovelace. Lyle Stuart/Citadel Press 1980, Bell Publishing 1980, Berkley Books 1981, Barricade Books 1989, Kensington Publishers 2006
 Out of Bondage with Linda Lovelace (foreword by Gloria Steinem) Lyle Stuart 1986, Berkley Books 1987, Barricade Books 1989, Kensington Publishers 2006
 A Dove in Vietnam Funk & Wagnalls 1969
 The Kitchen Sink Papers, My Life as a Househusband Doubleday 1975, New American Library 1976, Reader's Digest 1976
 Stranger than Naked: Or, How to Write Dirty Books for Fun and Profit Wyden Books 1970
 The Husband's Cookbook Lippincott 1979
 The Motel Tapes Warner Books 1977
 Establishment of Innocence with Harvey Aronson GP Putnam 1976, Berkley Books 1977
 Best Restaurants on Long Island Citadel Press 1986
 Crime Scientists Lippincott 1961
 Jungle Doctors Lippincott 1961
 Skin Diving Adventures with John J Floherty Lippincott 1962
 Whirling Wings with John J Floherty Lippincott 1961
 Youth and the FBI with John J Floherty (foreword by J Edgar Hoover) Lippincott 1960
 The Bedside Playboy The Perfect Alibi with Joe Hickey Playboy Press 1963

References 

1933 births
2012 deaths
20th-century American journalists
20th-century American male writers
20th-century American non-fiction writers
20th-century American novelists
American film critics
American male journalists
American war correspondents of the Vietnam War
Deaths from pneumonia in Washington (state)
Hoaxers
Newsday people
Nieman Fellows
People from Mason County, Washington
People from Northport, New York
People from Port Washington, New York
Writers from New York (state)
Yale College alumni